Ed Scott may refer to:
 Ed Scott (baseball player) (1870–1933), Major League Baseball player
 Ed Scott (baseball scout) (1917–2010), American baseball scout
 Edward W. Scott, American businessman

See also
 Edward Scott (disambiguation)